RTL Kettő (formerly RTL II) is a Hungarian commercial television channel, owned by RTL Group. It is rivaling with Super TV2 and Viasat3. The channel launched on 1 October 2012.

Beginnings 
In September 2011, RTL Klub started a project named RTL II to launch a new RTL channel in Hungary. In April 2012, it was announced, that RTL will launch RTL II in September or in October with I Love Gjoni (reality show); Who Wants to Be a Millionaire? (Hungarian version) and Heti Hetes (a weekly comedy show on Sunday nights).

In July 2012, something started to promote on RTL Klub with these sentences: Life Is Nice, The Sky Is Blue, The Grass Is Green; but it was not mentioned that these ads are advertising something. In September 2012, it was revealed, that these ads advertised RTL II, the new commercial television channel that will launch on 1 October 2012 and it will replace Reflektor TV.

At the launch the prime-time schedule of RTL II included series: Modern Family, White Collar, Terra Nova, Journeyman, The Forgotten, Chase, shows moved from RTL Klub: Who Wants to Be a Millionaire and Heti Hetes and a new magazine Forró nyomon.

On November 20, 2022, the channel is renamed RTL Kettő, adapting the visual identity of the parent channel RTL.

Programming aired by RTL Kettő

Series

Airing currently
 Barátok közt
 Burn Notice
 Chase
 CSI: Miami
 Dallas
 Homeland
 I delitti del cuoco
 Legend of the Seeker
 Pretty Little Liars
 Remington Steele
 The Big Bang Theory
 The Forgotten
 The Mentalist
 Without a Trace

Hiatus
 Modern Family (season 1 and 2 aired)
 White Collar (season 1, 2, 3, 4, 5, 6 aired)
 Friends (reruns of season 1 and 2 aired)
 Dollhouse (season 1 aired)

Ended
 Psych (ended)
 Journeyman (ended)
 Privileged (ended)
 Dollhouse (ended)

Local programs

Airing currently
 Szombat esti láz (Hungarian version of Dancing with the Stars)
 Showder Klub - stand-up comedy series
 NőComment! (pun with the Hungarian word for woman and the phrase "No Comment") - late night show with female-only guests, hosted by Claudia Liptai
 Vacsoracsata
 Segítség, bajban vagyok! (Help, I'm in Trouble!) - scripted reality-series
 Gazdálkodj okosan! reality series
 Az első millióm története (My first Million) reality magazine
 Péntektől péntekig (Friday to Friday) - weekly tabloid magazine
 ValóVilág (Real World) - RTL's successful reality show airing the 11th season in early 2023

Ended
 I Love Gjoni reality series
 Egy este... (One Night With...) - concert show
 Forró nyomon investigation magazine with Kriszta Máté, origins from TV2
 Legyen Ön is milliomos! with Sándor Friderikusz
 Heti Hetes - (Weekly Seven) - weekly newscast show based on the format of RTL DE's 7 Tage - 7 Köpfe 
 Official UEFA Europa League broadcaster (2015-2018), now on RTL Három

See also
RTL Group
RTL
Cool TV

References

Television in Hungary
RTL Group
Television networks in Hungary
Television channels and stations established in 2012
2012 establishments in Hungary
Mass media in Budapest